Arthur Mabillon (13 October 1888 – 13 October 1961) was a French archer. He competed at the 1920 Summer Olympics, winning three medals, two silver and a bronze.

References

1888 births
1961 deaths
French male archers
Olympic archers of France
Archers at the 1920 Summer Olympics
People from Claye-Souilly
Olympic silver medalists for France
Olympic bronze medalists for France
Olympic medalists in archery
Medalists at the 1920 Summer Olympics